City of Conquerors is a church started by We Are More Than Conquerors Deliverance Ministries.  The current building was formerly the West Philadelphia Jewish Community Center, as evidenced by the Jewish symbols on the exterior of the building at 11 South 63rd Street, Philadelphia, Pennsylvania.

Gallery

See also

External links

 WAMTCDM Official Website

Churches in Philadelphia
West Philadelphia